Lonely Lakes are located in Glacier National Park, in the U. S. state of Montana. The lakes are adjacent to each other and drain into Lake Creek.

See also
List of lakes in Glacier County, Montana

References

Lakes of Glacier National Park (U.S.)
Lakes of Glacier County, Montana